Monica is a 2022 drama film directed by Andrea Pallaoro, from a screenplay by Pallaoro and Orlando Tirado. It stars Trace Lysette, Patricia Clarkson, Emily Browning, and Adriana Barraza.

The film had its world premiere at the 79th Venice International Film Festival on September 3, 2022.

Plot

A woman returns home to care for her dying mother.

Cast
 Trace Lysette as Monica
 Patricia Clarkson as Eugenia 
 Emily Browning as Laura
 Adriana Barraza as Leticia
 Joshua Close as Paul

Production
In September 2020, Patricia Clarkson, Trace Lysette, Anna Paquin and Adriana Barraza joined the cast of the film, with Andrea Pallaoro directing from a screenplay he wrote alongside Orlando Tirado. In June 2021, Emily Browning joined the cast of the film, replacing Paquin who exited the project due to scheduling conflicts.

Principal photography began in June 2021.

Release
The film had its world premiere at the 79th Venice International Film Festival on September 3, 2022.  IFC Films bought the distribution rights.

References

External links
 

2022 films
2022 drama films
2020s American films
2020s English-language films
American drama films
English-language Italian films
Films about death
Films shot in Ohio
Films directed by Andrea Pallaoro
Italian drama films
Films about trans women
2022 LGBT-related films
American LGBT-related films
Italian LGBT-related films
2020s Italian films